Vladimir Burmakin (born 6 June 1967) is a Russian chess player. He was awarded the title of Grandmaster by FIDE in 1994.

Chess career
In 1994 he tied for 3rd-5th places in the Russian championship at Elista, with Sergei Rublevsky and Vasily Yemelin (Peter Svidler won, Mikhail Ulibin was second).

Burmakin won or shared first place in several tournaments:
  1993  – Szeged – Balatonberény – Werfen (repeated in 1996)
  1994  – Moscow – Graz (repeated in 1997 and 2001)
  1995  – Chigorin Memorial in Saint Petersburg
  1997  – Cappelle-la-Grande open (repeated in 2003)
  1999  – Pula
  2000  – Seefeld
  2002  – Geneva – Pardubice – Zurich
  2003  – Porto San Giorgio (repeated in 2006)
  2004  – Schwäbisch Gmünd (repeated in 2005, 2006, and 2007) – Bad Wörishofen (repeated in 2006 and 2008) – Benasque
  2005  – Schwarzach – Dordrecht, "Daniel Noteboom Memorial"
  2006  – Le Touquet – Béthune (repeated in 2007) –  Dos Hermanas
  2007  – Bratto (repeated in  2008) – Albacete – Salou – Sitges
  2008  – Benidorm – "BDO Premier" in Haarlem

Burmakin played for Russia in the European Senior Team Chess Championship 2019 in the 50+ division. His team won the gold medal.

Burmakin is an expert of the Caro-Kann defence, playing it almost invariably in his games against 1. e4; against 1. d4 he usually adopts the Chebanenko Variation of the Slav defence.

References

External links
 
 
 

1967 births
Living people
Chess grandmasters
Russian chess players
Place of birth missing (living people)